Sharoni is a surname of Hebrew origin. Notable people with the surname include:

Benny Sharoni, Israeli-American saxophonist
Moshe Sharoni (1929 - 2020), Israeli politician
Simona Sharoni (born 1961), Romanian-Israeli feminist scholar

Hebrew-language surnames
Jewish surnames